Zenun Selimi (born 21 November 1971) is a Kosovan football manager and former player who played as a winger.

Career
In 1998, Selimi signed for Ferencváros, Hungary's most successful club, before joining Young Boys in the Swiss second division.

In 2001, he signed for Bulgarian side Lokomotiv Sofia.

In 2002, he signed for Delémont in the Swiss top flight, before joining Swiss lower league team Tuggen.

References

External links
 
 

Living people
1971 births
Kosovan footballers
Association football wingers
Kosovo pre-2014 international footballers
Swiss Super League players
Nemzeti Bajnokság I players
Ferencvárosi TC footballers
BSC Young Boys players
FC Luzern players
FC Lokomotiv 1929 Sofia players
SR Delémont players
FC Wangen bei Olten players
FC Tuggen players
Swiss Challenge League players
First Professional Football League (Bulgaria) players
Kosovan football managers
Kosovan expatriate sportspeople in Switzerland
Expatriate footballers in Switzerland
Kosovan expatriates in Hungary
Expatriate footballers in Hungary
Kosovan expatriates in Bulgaria